Newton, sometimes known as Newton after Blake, is a 1995 work by the sculptor Eduardo Paolozzi. The large bronze sculpture is displayed on a high plinth in the piazza outside the British Library in London.

The sculpture is based on William Blake's 1795 print of Newton: Personification of Man Limited by Reason, which depicts a naked Isaac Newton sitting on ledge beside a mossy rock face while measuring with a pair of compasses or dividers.  The print was intended by Blake to criticise Newton's profane knowledge, usurping the sacred knowledge and power of the creator Urizen, with the scientist turning away from nature to focus on his books.

Paolozzi had admired Blake since viewing a large print of Newton at the Tate Gallery in the 1940s.  He was also a friend of Colin St John Wilson, the architect of the British Library, since they both participated in the This is Tomorrow exhibition at the Whitechapel Gallery in 1956.  Wilson intended to site a seated sculpture at the junction of the two main axes in the piazza of his library.  Paolozzi was then working on a sculpture of Newton, and he was commissioned to create the sculpture for the library.  The new library was constructed from 1982 to 1999, and the sculpture was installed in 1995.

The sculpture includes Paolozzi's self-portrait as the naked Newton, measuring the universe with his dividers.  The eyes were copied from Michelangelo's David. It can be interpreted as symbolising a confluence of the two cultures, the arts and the sciences, and illustrating how Newton changed our view of the world to one determined by mathematical laws. The sculpture makes the body resemble a mechanical object, joined with bolts at the shoulders, elbows, knees and ankles.  The sculptures shows the visible seams of Paolozzi's technique of dividing his model and reassembling the pieces, for example on the head.

The bronze was cast by the Morris Singer foundry; it was funded by the Foundation for Sport and the Arts. It was included in the Grade I listing of the library, granted in 2015.

A maquette was donated by the artist to the Isaac Newton Institute for Mathematical Sciences at the University of Cambridge.  A bronze model cast in 1988 "from the model made to show the Library committee", has been held by the Tate Gallery since 1995.

A similar sculpture from 1989, Master of the Universe, is at the Scottish National Gallery Of Modern Art in Edinburgh, with another example in Hong Kong.

Gallery

References

 The British Library, piazza, boundary wall and railings to Ossulston Street, Euston Road and Midland Road, National Heritage List for England, Historic England
 Statue: British Library – Newton, London Remembers
 Paolozzi’s Newton, British Library, Tate Gallery
 Paolozzi's Sculpture of Isaac Newton, Isaac Newton Institute for Mathematical Sciences
 Eduardo Paolozzi, Master of the Universe (1989), National Galleries Scotland
 British Library, Euston Road NW1, Ornamental Passions
 Blake 2.0: William Blake in Twentieth-Century Art, Music and Culture, edited by Steve Clark, T. Connolly, Jason Whittaker
 The Architecture of the British Library at St. Pancras, Roger Stonehouse, Gerhard Stromberg, p. 175

1995 sculptures
Bronze sculptures in London
Outdoor sculptures in London
Statues in London
Grade I listed buildings in the London Borough of Camden
Cultural depictions of Isaac Newton
British Library
1995 in England
Adaptations of works by William Blake